Bryan Ikemefuna Okoh (born 16 May 2003) is a Swiss professional footballer who plays as a centre back for Austrian Bundesliga club Red Bull Salzburg. Born in the United States, he represents Switzerland at the youth level.

Personal life
He was born in Houston, Texas, to Nigerian parents, but grew up in Switzerland.

Club career
In 2010, Okoh began his career at FC Espagnol Lausanne, before moving to FC Lausanne-Sport in 2016. In 2019, he moved to the youth team of Red Bull Salzburg and has been playing in their feeder team of Liefering since 2019.

Liefering
On 9 August 2019, he made his professional debut for Liefering in an away match against Lafnitz, ending in a 2–0 loss.

International career
Okoh has represented Switzerland from under-15 to under-21 age group.

Honours
Austrian Champion: 2022
Austrian Cup: 2022

References

External links 

 

2003 births 
Living people
Swiss men's footballers
Switzerland under-21 international footballers
Switzerland youth international footballers
American soccer players
American emigrants to Switzerland
Swiss people of Nigerian descent
American sportspeople of Nigerian descent
Association football defenders
2. Liga (Austria) players
FC Red Bull Salzburg players
Soccer players from Houston